His Nibs 
 May refer to: As in the novel (His Nibs) by Alan L Corbett, the Devil/Lucifer.

 Cribbage, a phrase used for a particular draw 
 His Nibs (film), a 1921 comedy film